The Caledonian Steam Packet Company provided a scheduled shipping service, carrying freight and passengers, on the west coast of Scotland. Formed in 1889 to complement the services of the Caledonian Railway, the company expanded by taking over rival ferry companies. In 1973, they were merged with MacBraynes as Caledonian MacBrayne.

Formation
Rival railway companies, the Caledonian Railway (CR), the North British Railway (NBR) and the Glasgow and South Western Railway (GSWR) at first used the services of various early private operators of Clyde steamers. The CR failed to attract private ship owners to their new extension from Greenock to the fishing village of Gourock. They had purchased the harbour at Gourock, which had advantages of a faster line from Glasgow, bypassing the Glasgow and South Western Railway Prince's Pier at Greenock, and being closer to the Clyde resorts. The CR began operating steamers on its own account in 1889.

The Caledonian Steam Packet Company (CSP) was formed as a packet company in May 1889, with Captain James Williamson as secretary and manager. Nominally an independent company, they bought the ships needed to operate steamer services to and from Gourock. On withdrawal of the Wemyss Bay Steamboat Company in 1890, CSP took over services to Rothesay, Largs and Millport. In June 1890, they established a service to Arran from the Lanarkshire and Ayrshire Railway railhead at Ardrossan. In the years that followed, there was significant investment in piers and ships.

Amalgamations

After years of fierce competition between all the fleets, the CR and GSWR amalgamated with several other railways at the start of 1923 to form the London, Midland and Scottish Railway (LMS) and their fleets amalgamated into the Caledonian Steam Packet Company, their funnels being painted yellow with a black top.

In 1935, Williamson-Buchanan Steamers was taken over by the Caledonian Steam Packet Company.

In 1945, the Caledonian Steam Packet Company took responsibility for the Kyleakin to Kyle of Lochalsh ferry.

With nationalisation in 1948, the LMS and LNER fleets were amalgamated as Clyde Shipping Services, under the control of the British Transport Commission.

In 1957 a reorganisation restored the Caledonian Steam Packet Company name, and in 1965 a red lion was added to each side of the black-topped yellow funnels. The headquarters remained at Gourock pierhead.

At the end of December 1968 management of the Caledonian Steam Packet Company passed to the Scottish Transport Group, which gained control of David MacBrayne's the following June. The MacBrayne service from Gourock to Ardrishaig ended on 30 September 1969, leaving the Clyde services entirely to the Caledonian Steam Packet Company.

Merger with MacBraynes
On 1 January 1973 the Caledonian Steam Packet Co. acquired most of the ships and routes of David MacBrayne Ltd and commenced joint Clyde and West Highland operations under the new name of Caledonian MacBrayne, with a combined headquarters at Gourock.

List of ships operated by the company

Sources

References

Ferry companies of Scotland
Packet (sea transport)
Shipping companies of Scotland
Defunct companies of Scotland
Defunct shipping companies of the United Kingdom
Highlands and Islands of Scotland
Transport in Argyll and Bute
Transport in Highland (council area)
Transport in Inverclyde
Transport in the Outer Hebrides
Transport companies established in 1889
Transport companies disestablished in 1973
1889 establishments in Scotland
1973 disestablishments in Scotland
Steam Packet Company
Steam Packet Company
1973 mergers and acquisitions
British companies disestablished in 1973
British companies established in 1889